The 2011–12 season was the 80th season in Málaga CF's history and their 31st season in La Liga, the top division of Spanish football. It covers a period from 1 July 2011 to 30 June 2012.

Málaga competed for an ambitious run in La Liga and entered the Copa del Rey in the Round of 32.

Players

Squad information
The numbers are established according to the official website:www.malagacf.es and www.lfp.esUpdated 29 April 2012''

Transfers

In

Total expenditure:  €52 million

Out

 

Total income:  €0 million

Club

Coaching staff

Competitions

La Liga

League table

Results summary

Results by round

Matches

Copa del Rey

Round of 32

Round of 16

Pre-season and friendlies

Statistics

Goals

Last updated: 13 May 2012
Source: Match reports in Competitive matches

Players

See also

 2011–12 Copa del Rey
 2011–12 La Liga

References

External links
  

Malaga
Málaga CF seasons